Daidarasaurus was a steel roller coaster located at Expoland in Suita, Osaka, Japan. According to some sources (i.e. the roller coaster database), Daidarasaurus was the second longest roller coaster in the world, behind Steel Dragon 2000. For reasons explained below, other sources (i.e. the Guinness Book of World Records) did not recognize Daidarasaurus's claim as longest roller coaster in the world from 1999 to 2000. Daidarasaurus has now been demolished as Expoland is now permanently closed. 

Daidarasaurus was formerly a dual-track racing coaster. In 1999 the two tracks were combined to create one exceptionally long track with two lift hills. This also made it a Möbius Loop. This effectively doubled the length of the ride. What remains in dispute is whether this actually qualified as one long coaster or back-to-back rides on the same coaster.

References 

 Expoland to close 21 months after fatal roller coaster disaster accessed June 7, 2009.

Roller coasters in Japan